Two vessels of the British Royal Navy have been named HMS Mandate:

  was a  launched in 1915 and sold in 1921.
  was an  launched in Toronto in August 1944 and arrived at Rosyth for breaking up in December 1957.

References
 

Royal Navy ship names